The Oratorio della Santissima Trinità, or Oratory of the Holy Trinity, is a Romanesque, Roman Catholic church located about two kilometers north of the town of Momo, on the west bank of the strada regionale 229, in province of Novara, Piedmont, Italy.

History
The small indistinct building with a stone, brick, and stucco belltower, reflects multiple reconstructions. The chapel was initially built in the mid to late 11th-century, but rebuilt and expanded over the next two centuries till labeled a church. The belltower has stones arrayed in a herringbone orientations, interspersed with brick. In the 17th century, a hermitage for a single occupant was attached to chapel.

While the exterior is mainly rustic, the oratory is known for its frescoes from the late 15th and early 16th centuries. Five of them survive on the southern exterior flank, depicting San Grato of Aosta (protector against inclement weather), St Antony Abbot, St Giulio, the Pieta, and St Christopher (patron of travelers).

The interior of the church was frescoed in 1512 by the Sperindio brothers and Francesco Cagnola. Along the walls of the nave are depictions of the Life and Passion of Christ. Some of the events derive from new testament Biblical Apocrypha.

Cagnola painted thirty-seven squares, framed by white or red bands: thirteen depict Stories of Christ's childhood, twenty-three Stories of his Passion and finally the Story of Original Sin. In the counterfacade arch, there is a depiction of the Final Judgment. In the apse, the superior portion depicts the Annunciation and Incarnation, while below is a Holy Trinity in an awkward mandorla. The lower registers have a panel of apostles, and below them, allegories of the Seven Works of Mercy''.

References

Gallery of Cagnola frescoes 

Churches in the province of Novara
11th-century Roman Catholic church buildings in Italy
15th-century Roman Catholic church buildings in Italy
Romanesque architecture in Piedmont
Momo, Piedmont